William John Orville "Batt" Phillips (September 23, 1902 – December 25, 1998) Canadian was a ice hockey player who played 27 games in the National Hockey League with the Montreal Maroons during the 1929–30 season. The rest of his career, which lasted from 1922 to 1942, was spent in various minor leagues. Born in Carleton Place, Ontario, later lived in British Columbia after retiring, and died in Qualicum Beach in 1998.

Career statistics

Regular season and playoffs

External links 
 

1902 births
1998 deaths
Canadian ice hockey centres
Cleveland Falcons players
Ice hockey people from Ontario
Montreal Maroons players
People from Carleton Place
Philadelphia Arrows players
Quebec Castors players
Vancouver Lions players
Windsor Bulldogs (1929–1936) players
Winnipeg Maroons players